Allen Academy is an independent co-educational day school located in Bryan, Texas that was founded in 1886 by John H. and Rivers O. Allen. The school is the oldest private school in the state of Texas and is a non-denominational pre-kindergarten through grade 12 school. It is a member of both the National Association of Independent Schools (NAIS) and the Texas Association of Private and Parochial Schools (TAPPS), and is accredited by the Southern Association of Colleges and Schools (SACS). Allen is also the only NAIS member school within a  radius.

About the school 
Allen Academy is made up of four separate "divisions":
Junior Kindergarten: JK3 (3-year-olds) and JK4 (4-year-olds)
Lower School: Kindergarten - Grade 5
Middle School: Grades 6-8
Upper School: Grades 9-12

Texas State Representative Kyle Kacal of College Station is an Allen Academy trustee.

References

External links 
 Official homepage

Independent Schools Association of the Southwest
Educational institutions established in 1886
Private K-12 schools in Texas
High schools in Brazos County, Texas
Bryan, Texas
1886 establishments in Texas